Project Pressure is a global environmental charity founded in 2008, with the mission of visualizing the climate crisis. Project Pressure uses art as a touchpoint to inspire action and behavioral change. Collaborating with a wide range of artists, and with partnerships such as NASA and the World Glacier Monitoring Service, Project Pressure's goal is to create and exhibit work aimed at engaging people emotionally, in order to incite climate action.

Since 2008, they have conducted more than 30 expeditions, creating scientific artworks. These are brought together in Meltdown—a museum exhibition that has been touring globally and has been regularly featured in The Guardian, BBC, CNN, Le Monde, Wired, and National Geographic. Meltdown has previously been shown at the Horniman Museum in London and is in 2022 to be shown at the Jacopic Gallery in Ljubljana and at Whirinaki Whare Taonga In New Zealand.

In 2019, Project Pressure created Voices For The Future, an art piece projected and transmitted on the UN building in New York City that showcased the voices of six young climate activists, including Greta Thunberg.

Project Pressure was founded by the Danish explorer and photographer Klaus Thymann in 2008. Since then, Project Pressure has pioneered innovative technological strategies and forged partnerships with the World Glacier Monitoring Service and NASA. In 2011, Project Pressure was recognized as an official contributor to the Global Terrestrial Network for Glaciers.

Glacier mass loss can be directly attributed to global temperature changes. Glaciers are key indicators of climate change and the focus of the charity's visualizations. These are vital human stories, as glaciers provide water for billions of people and their crops, so their loss is not just a natural disaster, but the beginning of a humanitarian crisis.

Function

Since 2008, the charity's resources have been put into projects that help people understand the logistics behind climate change to achieve real solutions. The charity drives advocacy at the national and supranational level with policymakers, encouraging mass behavior change and appropriate activism calling for the urgent implementation and scaling of scientifically backed solutions.

Project Pressure works with front-line activists, trades unions and employer bodies, faith groups, and charitable organizations by providing them with material to communicate their messages around sustainability and environmental protection.

Additionally, Project Pressure functions as a content provider for existing partners, communicating on multiple platforms. This includes well-established relationships with progressive governments, museums and cultural organizations, the global mass media, and other public bodies and grassroots organizations such as Fridays For Future.

Funding

Recognition and funding have come from several global benefactors, including the Arts Council England, Government of Switzerland, United Nations, The Lighthouse Foundation, Getty Images, The Danish Embassy, Hasselblad, the Swiss Federal Office for the Environment, and HRH Queen Margrethe II of Denmark.

List of projects

2012 – 2019 artist expeditions 
Between 2008 and 2011, Project Pressure artists conducted expeditions with the purpose of creating content. This content later developed into the exhibition Meltdown.

Renate Aller 
– Germany (born 1960)

Climate change is altering where water is being stored—shifting water from earth, glaciers, and ice bodies to the oceans. Renate Aller's work creates a visual journey of the hydrologic cycle, starting in the mountain glaciers and finishing in New York. The series highlights how all Earth's systems are linked by water and that impact and effect is dispersed geographically. For humans this impact will mainly be felt in coastal cities, but this global problem will affect different communities disproportionately.

Corey Arnold 
– United States (born 1976)

Over a three-week period in September 2013, fine art photographer and fisherman Corey Arnold travelled around the Arctic Archipelago of Svalbard aboard the Polish supply ship Horyzont. Arnold's long periods at sea are evident in his work as it reflects on the interconnectivity between the natural world, the sea, and tidal glaciers. Glacial ice has been documented in the Hornsund fjord since 1899, and with the current changes in the Arctic, Arnold's work functions as a reminder of the relation between climate change and sea-level rise.

Michael Benson 
– United States (born 1962)

Michael Benson's work is focused on the intersection of art and science. He uses a variety of image-processing techniques to create composite images from raw data from planetary science archives. Benson creates satellite landscape photography to show the ice fields of both the Arctic and Antarctica, the only way to show ice bodies of this scale.

Broomberg and Chanarin 
– South Africa (born 1970) and United Kingdom (born 1971)

In the wake of global heating, Adam Broomberg and Oliver Chanarin show how the rapidly shrinking glaciers are revealing artefacts that have until now been perfectly preserved in the frozen mass. Their work, created in collaboration with archaeological institutions and glaciologists in Switzerland, hint at intimate and complex human stories buried inside the ice. This series show the remains from a young female from the 17th century. The circumstances of how the young woman ended up in the ice and subsequently spent centuries inside the glacier is unknown. Her skeleton and partly mummified body were found together with some personal belongings in 1988 when the Swiss glacier named “Porchabella”, meaning beautiful snow, had started melting away.

Edward Burtynsky 
– Canada (born 1955)

Edward Burtynsky shows us how we are reshaping the Earth in colossal ways, highlighting the impact of human activity. The anthropogenic climate crisis is one where humans are both engineers and victims. The images of the vast Icelandic landscape depict the beauty and monumental scale of the meltwater runoff with hints of manmade features. Burtynsky reminds us that we are losing a vital source of fresh water as glaciers continue to diminish across the globe.

Scott Conarroe 
– Canada (born 1974)

Scott Conarroe's large format photos evoke romantic pictorial traditions while placing the landscape into a contemporary context. Conarroe studies the boundaries devised by Alpine nations, where borderlines are defined by glaciers. Part of the terrain is made up of ice and as the glaciers retreat, the terrain itself shifts, resulting in a new topography where the countries’ actual borders are changing. Conarroe's work invokes questions of territorial claim and possible geopolitical consequences as borders are being redrawn.

Peter Funch 
– Denmark (born 1974)

Peter Funch's artworks are based on postcards and historic images that serve as comparative sources of visual information where the effects of climate change can be traced by evidence of glacial retreat. During the Industrial Revolution, considered to be the starting point of the current climate crisis, huge progress was made in the development of photographic processes such as the Red Green Blue separation technique used in Funch's images. This acts as a metaphor to illustrate the presence of human interference, man-made alterations in the landscape and the passing of time.

Noémie Goudal 
– France (born 1984)

In order to mirror the shifting glacial landscape and make the changing environment tangible, Noémie Goudal constructed a large-scale photographic installation printed on biodegradable paper that disintegrates when exposed to water. As the image dissolves, the artificial landscape can be viewed against its natural form, functioning as a reminder of the instability of the seemingly stable as well as a visualization of the accelerating transformations in nature.

Adam Hinton 
– United Kingdom (born 1965)

Adam Hinton's 8-minute film shows the social impact of climate change. He visited farming communities in India who depend on water runoff, showing the environmental effects on their lives. Unstable weather patterns are leading to diminishing crops, causing hunger and involuntary migration. Hinton tells the story of six families, but more than a billion people rely on water from the Himalayas.

Richard Mosse 
– Ireland (born 1980)

Conceptual documentary photographer Richard Mosse used a large-format plate-film camera to photograph the ice cave under the Vatnajökull glacier in Iceland. Glacier caves usually form when air enters where water flows underneath the ice, the warm air slowly creates melting and forms a cave from beneath. The dynamic process is becoming more unpredictable as the weather changes and cave access may become impossible in the future.

Simon Norfolk 
– Nigeria (born 1963)

In October 2014, Simon Norfolk traced the previous glacial area of Lewis Glacier, Mount Kenya, using fire to show the glacier extent in 1963, 1987, and 2004. The result are comparative images representing the historic as well as the current glacial front. In utilising a dramatic juxtaposition of elements alongside a simple message, Norfolk produced highly potent artwork. This series was the winner of the Sony World Photography Award 2015 (landscape category).

Norfolk and Thymann 
– Nigeria (born 1963) and Denmark (born 1974)

In an attempt to preserve an ice-grotto tourist attraction at the Rhône Glacier, local Swiss entrepreneurs wrapped a significant section of the ice-body in a thermal blanket. In their collaborative work, Simon Norfolk and Klaus Thymann address financial issues as driving forces behind human adaptation to the changing climate. The title, "Shroud", refers to the melting glacier under its death cloak. In addition, a thermal image time-lapse film was created, showing how glaciers compare to the surrounding landscape by only reacting to long-term temperature changes, as opposed to weather fluctuations.

The project was featured in New Scientist and the Los Angeles Times.

Christopher Parsons 
– United Kingdom (born 1983)

Christopher Parsons joined forces with a research team studying glaciers in the Himalayas. Samples taken on location were cultured and analysed, revealing microbiological organisms that are not visible to the naked eye. As the climate gets warmer, microbes adapt, sometimes with negative effects for human life (such as the development of new diseases). By displaying microscopic elements alongside the Nepalese landscape, the viewer is offered multiple perspectives of the climate crisis.

Toby Smith 
– United Kingdom (born 1982)

Mount Aragats has four distinctive peaks and an extensive volcanic massif that rises in isolation above Armenia's flat plain. The very top of the mountain is the highest point of the country and the lower Caucasus, and the glaciers are key to the area's hydrology. Smith summited and circumnavigated Aragats, exploring communities and landscapes rich in religious and scientific iconography, showing the long history of civilisation in a place which, in similarity with other rural areas, the mountains hold a special place for both the local ecology and faith.

Klaus Thymann 
– Denmark (born 1974)

Klaus Thymann seeks to challenge conceptions of where glaciers exist, thus emphasising the importance of treating climate change as a global issue, rather than just centred around the poles. Mapping and exploring white spots on the map are vital elements of his practice highlighting how temperature changes and their effects on our resources are not evenly distributed around the globe.

Erwin van den IJssel/PostPanic, Erik Schytt Holmlund, and Klaus Thymann 
Sourcing images from 1946, 1959, 1980, and 2017 of the Tarfala Valley and the Kebnekaise Mountain in Sweden, the team developed a new way of visualising historic change through photogrammetry.

Meltdown 
In 2018, the first chapter of expeditions and content was completed. The work was gathered into the exhibition Meltdown – Visualizing Climate Change, which premiered at the Natural History Museum, Vienna in 2019.
Meltdown is a travelling exhibition with interactive features. The target audience is younger people in education and the general public. During the first year of launch (until the COVID-19 pandemic), the venues attracted over 1.5 million visitors. Meltdown is to be shown at Jacopic Galley, Ljubljana from January to May 2022.

As an example of the exhibition's interactive features, Project Pressure developed a carbon footprint calculator to encourage audience engagement. To learn how carbon-intense their lifestyle is, users answer a series of questions to get an estimate as well as recommendations for improvements to make in areas such as home, transport, energy, food, and Internet usage.

Voices For The Future 

In 2019, Project Pressure was responsible for Voices For The Future, an art piece projected and transmitted on the UN building in New York in the lead up to the UN Climate Action Summit. Voices For The Future showcased the voices of six young activists, including Greta Thunberg, commenting on the climate crisis and the urgent actions that need to be taken to minimize its consequences. The art piece was visualised by Joseph Michael, authored by Klaus Thymann, and soundtracked by musician and artist Brian Eno.

References 

Charities
Environmental agencies